Armando Ricciardi (1 April 1905 – unknown) was an Italian boxer who competed in the 1924 Summer Olympics. In 1924 at the age of 19, he was eliminated in the first round of the bantamweight class after losing his fight to Salvatore Tripoli on a decision.

References

External links
profile

1905 births
Year of death missing
Bantamweight boxers
Olympic boxers of Italy
Boxers at the 1924 Summer Olympics
Italian male boxers
20th-century Italian people